Nettlecombe is a civil parish in the English county of Somerset. The parish covers a rural area below the Brendon Hills, comprising the small hamlets of Beggearn Huish, Torre, Woodford Yarde, together with more isolated individual farms and homes. In 2011, the parish had a population of 174.

The village takes its name from Nettlecombe Court, an Elizabethan manor house which was once the manorial centre of the area.

There are no shops or other services within the parish, which is instead served by the nearby village of Williton.

History
The manor was held before the Norman Conquest by Godwin, son of King Harold, and subsequently was the property of the crown. In 1160 it was granted to Hugh de Ralph and has never been sold since. It passed down through the family to John Trevelyan in 1481 and is still held by his successors.

The parish of Nettlecombe was part of the Williton and Freemanners Hundred.

Governance
Administratively, the civil parish falls within the Somerset West and Taunton local government district within the Somerset shire county, with administrative tasks shared between county, district and parish councils.

The parish council has responsibility for local issues, including setting an annual precept (local rate) to cover the council's operating costs and producing annual accounts for public scrutiny. The parish council evaluates local planning applications and works with the local police, district council officers, and neighbourhood watch groups on matters of crime, security, and traffic. The parish council's role also includes initiating projects for the maintenance and repair of parish facilities, as well as consulting with the district council on the maintenance, repair, and improvement of highways, drainage, footpaths, public transport, and street cleaning. Conservation matters (including trees and listed buildings) and environmental issues are also the responsibility of the council.

The village falls within the non-metropolitan district of Somerset West and Taunton, which was established on 1 April 2019. It was previously in the district of West Somerset, which was formed on 1 April 1974 under the Local Government Act 1972, and part of Williton Rural District before that. The district council is responsible for local planning and building control, local roads, council housing, environmental health, markets and fairs, refuse collection and recycling, cemeteries and crematoria, leisure services, parks, and tourism.

Somerset County Council is responsible for running the largest and most expensive local services such as education, social services, libraries, main roads, public transport, policing and  fire services, trading standards, waste disposal and strategic planning.

It is also part of the Bridgwater and West Somerset county constituency represented in the House of Commons of the Parliament of the United Kingdom. It elects one Member of Parliament (MP) by the first past the post system of election.

Religious sites
The Church of St Mary the Virgin dates from the thirteenth and fourteenth centuries, with further alterations since. It lies within the grounds of Nettlecombe Court, and has been designated as a grade I listed building.

Climate

Along with the rest of South West England, Nettlecombe has a temperate climate which is generally wetter and milder than the rest of England. In general, December is the dullest month and June the sunniest. The south west of England enjoys a favoured location, particularly in summer, when the Azores High extends its influence north-eastwards towards the UK.

Cloud often forms inland, especially near hills, and reduces exposure to sunshine. The average annual sunshine totals around 1,600 hours. Rainfall tends to be associated with Atlantic depressions or with convection. In summer, convection caused by solar surface heating sometimes forms shower clouds and a large proportion of the annual precipitation falls from showers and thunderstorms at this time of year. About 8–15 days of snowfall is typical. November to March have the highest mean wind speeds, with June to August having the lightest. The predominant wind direction is from the south-west.

References

External links

Web page of parish council

Civil parishes in Somerset
Villages in West Somerset